David Campbell-James (born 29 December 1949) is a British sailor. He competed in the Tornado event at the 1984 Summer Olympics.

References

External links
 

1949 births
Living people
British male sailors (sport)
Olympic sailors of Great Britain
Sailors at the 1984 Summer Olympics – Tornado
Sportspeople from Chester